Sorbitol dehydrogenase is an enzyme that in humans is encoded by the SORD gene.

References

Further reading

External links